Charles Simonton may refer to:

 Charles Bryson Simonton (1838-1911), member of the United States Congress
 Charles Henry Simonton (1829–1904), United States federal judge